Corn allergy, also called maize allergy, is a very rare food allergy. People with a true IgE-mediated allergy to corn develop symptoms such as swelling or hives when they eat corn or foods that contain corn. The allergy can be difficult to manage due to many food and non-food products that contain various forms of corn, such as corn starch and modified food starch, among many others. It is an allergy that often goes unrecognized.

Symptoms 
As a result of a possible immunoglobulin E (IgE) allergy to corn, symptoms can resemble that of any other recognized allergy, including anaphylaxis. As with other food allergies, most people who are allergic to corn have mild symptoms.

Causes 
Corn allergies is caused by certain proteins which are found within the corn kernel. Currently, the maize lipid transfer protein is known to cause corn allergies, The mechanisms of the allergy are unknown.

Management
As with other food allergies, there is no cure. Since the allergy is rarely reported, diagnosis of the allergen that causes the corn allergy has been difficult. Most people who are allergic to corn cannot eat corn or anything containing proteins from corn. Many people who are allergic to corn can still eat sugars purified from corn, such as corn syrup.

Epidemiology

See also
 List of allergies
 Food intolerance – another cause of illness after eating a particular food

References

Food allergies
Allergy, corn